Speedball Hackett is an American former Negro league pitcher who played in the 1920s.

Hackett made his Negro leagues debut in 1927 with the Harrisburg Giants. He went on to play for the Philadelphia Tigers the following season.

References

External links
 and Seamheads

Year of birth missing
Place of birth missing
Harrisburg Giants players
Philadelphia Tigers players
Baseball pitchers